The Grad–Shafranov equation (H. Grad and H. Rubin (1958); Vitalii Dmitrievich Shafranov (1966)) is the equilibrium equation in ideal magnetohydrodynamics (MHD) for a two dimensional plasma, for example the axisymmetric toroidal plasma in a tokamak. This equation takes the same form as the Hicks equation from fluid dynamics. This equation is a two-dimensional, nonlinear, elliptic partial differential equation obtained from the reduction of the ideal MHD equations to two dimensions, often for the case of toroidal axisymmetry (the case relevant in a tokamak). Taking  as the cylindrical coordinates, the flux function  is governed by the equation,

where  is the magnetic permeability,  is the pressure,  and the magnetic field and current are, respectively, given by

Derivation (in Cartesian coordinates) 

Then the magnetic field can be written in cartesian coordinates as

or more compactly,

where  is the vector potential for the in-plane (x and y components) magnetic field. Note that based on this form for B we can see that A is constant along any given magnetic field line, since  is everywhere perpendicular to B. (Also note that -A is the flux function  mentioned above.)

Two dimensional, stationary, magnetic structures are described by the balance of pressure forces and magnetic forces, i.e.:

where p is the plasma pressure and j is the electric current. It is known that p is a constant along any field line, (again since  is everywhere perpendicular to B). Additionally, the two-dimensional assumption means that the z- component of the left hand side must be zero, so the z-component of the magnetic force on the right hand side must also be zero.

The right hand side of the previous equation can be considered in two parts:

where the  subscript denotes the component in the plane perpendicular to the -axis. The  component of the current in the above equation can be written in terms of the one-dimensional vector potential as

The in plane field is

and using Maxwell–Ampère's equation, the in plane current is given by

Rearranging the cross products above leads to

and

Thus, factoring out  and rearranging terms yields the Grad–Shafranov equation:

References

 Grad, H., and Rubin, H. (1958) Hydromagnetic Equilibria and Force-Free Fields. Proceedings of the 2nd UN Conf. on the Peaceful Uses of Atomic Energy, Vol. 31, Geneva: IAEA p. 190.
 Shafranov, V.D. (1966) Plasma equilibrium in a magnetic field, Reviews of Plasma Physics, Vol. 2, New York: Consultants Bureau, p. 103.
 Woods, Leslie C. (2004) Physics of plasmas, Weinheim: WILEY-VCH Verlag GmbH & Co. KGaA, chapter 2.5.4
 Haverkort, J.W. (2009) Axisymmetric Ideal MHD Tokamak Equilibria. Notes about the Grad–Shafranov equation, selected aspects of the equation and its analytical solutions.
 Haverkort, J.W. (2009) Axisymmetric Ideal MHD equilibria with Toroidal Flow. Incorporation of toroidal flow, relation to kinetic and two-fluid models, and discussion of specific analytical solutions.

Magnetohydrodynamics
Elliptic partial differential equations